The 1981–82 season was Chelsea Football Club's sixty-eighth competitive season.

Season summary
Chelsea began the season with a new manager, John Neal, Geoff Hurst having been sacked at the end of the previous season. Neal's arrival brought no immediate upturn in the club's fortunes, and they finished 12th in the Second Division for the second successive year. The highlight of the season was a run to the quarter-finals of the FA Cup (the club's first appearance in a cup quarter-final since 1973), which included a 2–0 win over reigning European champions Liverpool. 

Off the pitch, the club were purchased by businessman Ken Bates for £1 in April 1982.

Table

References

External links
 1981–82 season at stamford-bridge.com

1981–82
English football clubs 1981–82 season